Yasnogorsk is the name of several urban localities in Russia:
Yasnogorsk, Tula Oblast, a town in Yasnogorsky District of Tula Oblast; administratively incorporated as a town under district jurisdiction
Yasnogorsk, Zabaykalsky Krai, an urban-type settlement in Olovyanninsky District of Zabaykalsky Krai